The Bromoanilines form a group of three isomers where the bromine atom occupies the para, ortho or meta position on the aromatic ring. 

Bromoaniline isomer can refer to:

 2-Bromoaniline (o-Bromoaniline)
 3-Bromoaniline (m-Bromoaniline)
 4-Bromoaniline (p-Bromoaniline)

Anilines
Bromoarenes